List of presidents of the Sami Parliament of Finland.

This is a list of presidents (speakers) of the Sami Parliament of Finland since that body was established in 1996:

Sources

Finland politics-related lists
Finland, Sami
Members of the Sámi Parliament of Finland
Politics of Finland
Sámi in Finland
Sámi politics
 
Sámi-related lists